Stephen George Welsh (born 19 April 1968) is a Scottish former professional footballer and Academy manager at Northern Premier League side Ilkeston FC.

As a player Welsh was a defender from 1989 to 2002. He moved into coaching in 2005 with Boston United where he later took the step up to become manager between 2008 and 2009 before being sacked. He was re-hired by Boston in 2011 as the club's Head of Youth.

Career

Playing career
In a career spanning thirteen seasons, Welsh played as a central defender for Wimborne Town, Cambridge United, Peterborough United, Preston North End, Partick Thistle, Dunfermline Athletic, Ayr United, where he scored a classic goal against Queens Park FC at Hampton Park, Lincoln City and finally King's Lynn.

Coaching career
In February 2001, Welsh was appointed Football in the Community Officer at Lincoln City, with the role commencing at the beginning of the 2001–2002 season and meaning an end to his professional career. Welsh also became manager of the club's under-16 Centre of Excellence side. In December 2004, Welsh was appointed manager of Spalding United and announced that, where necessary, he would also make a playing return.

Steve joined Boston United in October 2005 as first team coach. After Neil Richardson left the club he also took on the role of Head of Youth, which involved work with the club's Centre of Excellence and the Bedford College Educational Scheme. He stayed at the club during four months without pay when the club hit a financial crisis in early 2007. On 18 November 2008 Tommy Taylor left Boston by mutual consent and Welsh was appointed caretaker manager. He was appointed permanent first team manager the following month after a satisfactory spell of results. Speaking of Welsh's appointment Boston United chairman David Newton said: "Steve ticked all the boxes with the exception of actual management experience. He now has the rest of the season to move from coach to manager, a step that we believe he can take, and we will be supporting him all the way."

Former Brentford and Boston United midfielder Stewart Talbot said it was the, 'right appointment at the right time'. Welsh fell ill over the New Year (08/09) and doctors advised him to stay at home and rest. As a result, he missed one game at home to Nantwich. Welsh picked the starting line-up but Talbot took charge of the match and United lost 5–0. Welsh appointed Andrew Stanhope as his assistant manager in early 2009 but was sacked later that year. He was re-appointed to the club in 2011 as the Head of Youth.

Personal life
Steve Welsh was born in Glasgow in 1967, and served in the British army before embarking on his football career. He also led Ilkeston Academy on an extraordinary run in the F.A youth cup in the season of 2015/16

References

External links

Unofficial Steve Welsh Profile at The Forgotten Imp

Living people
1968 births
Footballers from Glasgow
Scottish footballers
English Football League players
Scottish Premier League players
Scottish Football League players
Cambridge United F.C. players
Peterborough United F.C. players
Preston North End F.C. players
Partick Thistle F.C. players
Dunfermline Athletic F.C. players
Ayr United F.C. players
Lincoln City F.C. players
King's Lynn F.C. players
Spalding United F.C. managers
Boston United F.C. managers
Wimborne Town F.C. players
Association football defenders
Scottish football managers
British Army soldiers